Steven Earl Riddick (born September 18, 1951) is an American athlete and winner of the gold medal in 4×100 meter relay at the 1976 Summer Olympics.

Personal life 

Riddick was raised in Hampton, Virginia. His father was a Church of Christ minister there.

Riddick was a late starter in track, concentrating on team sports until his junior year at high school.

After high school, Riddick attended at Norfolk State University, having been recruited by coach Dick Price. There he met his wife Theresita Renee Coleman.

For the last year of his psychology degree course he ran for the Philadelphia Pioneers track club because his college eligibility had ended. It was a move engineered by Coach Price who put Riddick in contact with the Philadelphia Pioneers coach Alex Woodley.

After graduation in 1975, Riddick moved first to Washington D.C. and then Philadelphia and continued to run for the Philadelphia Pioneers club.

Track career 

Riddick attempted to qualify for the 1972 Munich Olympics but was eliminated at the semi-final stage in both the 100 and 200 m at the United States Olympic Trials.

In 1975, in Zurich, he ran the fastest automatically timed 100 m of the year at 10.05 s, a time that remained his personal best. He had started that year by causing some amazement and amusement when he ran and won an indoor race in his sweat pants. The reason: he had forgotten his shorts. He won the final in borrowed shorts.

At the 1976 Montreal Olympics, Steven Riddick was eliminated in the semi-final of the 100 m race, but   ran the anchor leg in the gold medal-winning American 4 × 100 m relay team (with Harvey Glance, Johnny 'Lam' Jones and Millard Hampton). Riddick had finished third in the 100 m final at the United States Olympic Trials. He narrowly missed-out on doubling-up at 200 m at the Olympics by finishing fourth in the 200 final - he was narrowly passed in the closing stages by Mark Lutz.

Riddick was a member of American 4 × 100 m relay team, which won the 1977 IAAF World Cup with a new world record of 38.03 s (with Cliff Wiley, Bill Collins and Steve Williams). He was also a member of American 4 × 100 m relay team, which won the 1979 Pan American Games(with Mike Roberson, Harvey Glance and Cliff Wiley) and placed second in 1979 IAAF World Cup (with Mike Roberson, Harvey Glance and Mel Lattany).

In 1978, he won the 100 m and anchored the United States 4 × 100 m relay team to victory in the USA versus USSR meet at the University of California's Edwards Stadium, and so helping the United States to its first overall victory in the dual meet series since 1969.

Riddick attempted to qualify for the 100 m at the 1984 Los Angeles Olympics but was eliminated at the quarter-final stage at the United States Olympic Trials.

Surprisingly, Riddick never achieved much success at the USA National Championships outdoors during his career - his best was fourth in the 100 m (in 1974, 1977, 1978 and 1979) and fifth in the 200 m (in 1977 and 1979) - he was, however, twice United States champion indoors at 60 y in 1977 and 1979. His indoor successes in 1977 led him to being voted  Track and Field News's indoor athlete of the year.

Riddick ran for his college Norfolk State University until 1974 winning NCAA division titles. He then joined the Philadelphia Pioneers track club. The Philadelphia Pioneer Educational Athletic Development Club, the proper name for the Philadelphia Pioneers, were the brainchild of Alexander J. Woodley. During the period 1977–1981, when Riddick was a member, they were the premier track club in the United States.

In 1980, Riddick was inducted into the Athletic Hall of Fame of The Lower Virginia Peninsula.

In 1997, Riddick was inducted into the Hampton Roads African American Sports Hall of Fame.

Rankings 

Riddick was ranked among the best in the US and the world in both the 100 and 200 m sprint events from 1973 to 1979, according to the votes of the experts of Track and Field News.

Coaching career 

After his athletics career, Riddick was a coach at Norfolk State University.

Riddick enjoyed some early success in the role, but his reputation was tarnished when he was embroiled in a scandal over the misappropriation of university travel funds for which he was sacked.

Money laundering and bank fraud scandal
In 2006, Riddick was indicted and arrested on fraud charges for his alleged involvement in a money laundering scheme. His former student, Tim Montgomery, was also a defendant in the case and Montgomery's former girlfriend, 5-time Olympic medalist sprinter Marion Jones, was also found to have been involved in the operation.

In 2008, Riddick was sentenced to five years and three months in federal prison for counterfeiting checks.

References

External links

1951 births
Living people
American male sprinters
American people convicted of fraud
American sportspeople convicted of crimes
Athletes (track and field) at the 1976 Summer Olympics
Hampton High School (Virginia) alumni
Medalists at the 1973 Summer Universiade
Medalists at the 1976 Summer Olympics
Medalists at the 1979 Pan American Games
Olympic gold medalists for the United States in track and field
Athletes (track and field) at the 1979 Pan American Games
Norfolk State Spartans men's track and field athletes
Norfolk State Spartans track and field coaches
Pan American Games gold medalists for the United States
Pan American Games medalists in athletics (track and field)
Universiade medalists in athletics (track and field)
Universiade gold medalists for the United States
USA Indoor Track and Field Championships winners
Sportspeople from Newport News, Virginia
Track and field athletes from Virginia